USS Kestrel or USS Kestrel II has been the name of more than one United States Navy ship, and may refer to:

 , a patrol vessel in commission from 1917 to 1919
 , a minesweeper in commission from 1941 to 1945
 , a minesweeper in commission from 1954 to 1957

United States Navy ship names